Steven Clark Rockefeller (born April 19, 1936) is a fourth-generation member of the Rockefeller family, and a former dean of Middlebury College. He is one of the oldest living members of the family who still carries the Rockefeller name, in addition to John D. Rockefeller IV.

Rockefeller is a philanthropist who focuses on education, Planned Parenthood, human rights and environmental causes. He is a trustee of the Asian Cultural Council and an advisory trustee of the Rockefeller Brothers Fund. He has also served as a director of the Rockefeller Philanthropy Advisors.

Biography
He is the second-oldest son of former U.S. Vice President Nelson A. Rockefeller and his first wife, Mary Rockefeller.

Rockefeller attended prestigious Deerfield Academy and received his A.B. degree from Princeton University, where he was president of The Ivy Club and also received the Moses Taylor Pyne Honor Prize. Subsequently, he obtained an M.Div. degree from the Union Theological Seminary in New York City, and a Ph.D. degree in philosophy of religion from Columbia University. He is a professor emeritus of Religion at Middlebury College in Middlebury, Vermont where he previously served as college dean and chairman of the religion department.

In 1959, he married Anne-Marie Rasmussen in Søgne, Norway; Anne-Marie was a former employee in the Rockefeller household. The couple had three children before divorcing. Steven Rockefeller remarried and had one child before the marriage ended in divorce. He then wed Barbara Bellows on May 11, 1991.

In 1976, he began an intensive study of Zen Buddhism, making frequent week-long visits to the Zen Center in Rochester, where he was a trustee.

He coordinated the drafting of the Earth Charter for the Earth Charter Commission and Earth Council. In 2005, he moderated the international launch of the United Nations Decade of Education for Sustainable Development (DESD) (2005–14) in its headquarters in New York, launched by UNESCO and attended by Nane Annan, the wife of Secretary General Kofi Annan.  He is Co-Chair of Earth Charter International Council and has written numerous essays on the Earth Charter, available at the Earth Charter website.

Publications
He has edited or written three books:
 The Christ and the Bodhisattva (SUNY Series in Buddhist Studies).  Edited by Donald S. Lopez Jr., and Steven C. Rockefeller.  State University of New York Press (1987)
 Rockefeller, Steven C.  John Dewey:  Religious Faith and Democratic Humanism. Columbia University Press (1991)
 Spirit and Nature -- Why the Environment Is a Religious Issue: An Interfaith Dialogue. Edited by Steven C. Rockefeller and John C. Elder.  Beacon Press (1992).

Further reading
 Rasmussen, Anne-Marie. There Was Once a Time of Islands, Illusions, and Rockefellers. New York and London: Harcourt Brace, 1975.

See also
 James Parks Morton Interfaith Award

References

External links
 The Cousins A 1984 New York Times profile of prominent members of the fourth-generation Rockefellers. (requires subscription)
 Steven C. Rockefeller - Rockefeller Brothers Fund website

 
1936 births
American philanthropists
Living people
Children of vice presidents of the United States
Middlebury College faculty
Princeton University alumni
Rockefeller family
Clark banking family
Winthrop family
People from Middlebury, Vermont
Union Theological Seminary (New York City) alumni
Deerfield Academy alumni
American religion academics